The White Devil is a 1930 German historical drama film directed by Alexandre Volkoff and starring Ivan Mozzhukhin, Lil Dagover and Betty Amann. It was based on Leo Tolstoy's 1912 novella Hadji Murat. It was originally made as a silent film, with a soundtrack added later. Anatole Litvak worked as the film's assistant director and production manager. It was shot at the Bebelberg Studios in Berlin. The film's sets were designed by the art directors Alexandre Lochakoff and Vladimir Meingard. After location shooting in Nice, Switzerland and the French Alps during 1929, it premiered at the Ufa-Palast am Zoo in January 1930.

Cast
 Ivan Mozzhukhin as Hadschi Murat 
 Lil Dagover as Nelidowa 
 Betty Amann as Saira 
 Fritz Alberti as Nicolai I.
 Acho Chakatouny as Schamil 
 George Seroff as Rjaboff 
 Alexander Murski as Woronzoff 
 Kenneth Rive as Jussuff, Murat's son 
 Eduardowa-Ballett as Dancers 
 Henry Bender   
 Rudolf Biebrach   
 Alexej Bondireff 
 Bobby Burns   
 Arthur Cavara   
 Hugo Döblin   
 Harry Hardt   
 Serge Jaroff   
 A. Kawarro   
 Peter Lorre   (unknown role - not easily visible in the film)
 Lydia Potechina   
 Marianne Winkelstern

References

Bibliography
 Kreimeier, Klaus. The Ufa Story: A History of Germany's Greatest Film Company, 1918–1945. University of California Press, 1999.

External links

The Jaroff's Don Cossack Choir performs Vo Kuznitse.

1930 films
1930s historical drama films
German historical drama films
Films of the Weimar Republic
1930s German-language films
Films directed by Alexandre Volkoff
Films set in Russia
Films set in the 19th century
Transitional sound films
Films based on short fiction
Films based on works by Leo Tolstoy
German black-and-white films
UFA GmbH films
1930 drama films
1930s German films
Films shot at Babelsberg Studios